Alexis-Jean-Pierre Paucton (1736–1798) was a French mathematician.

1736 births
1798 deaths
18th-century French mathematicians